"Follow the Wind" is a song by Barry Gibb and the Bee Gees. Written by Barry Gibb, produced by Bill Shepherd, released as the B-side of "Wine and Women" which was charted in Australia. It was later included on The Bee Gees Sing and Play 14 Barry Gibb Songs (1965). It was one of the folk rock songs on the album the others are "I Don't Think It's Funny", "And the Children Laughing" and "I Was a Lover, a Leader of Men".

Song development
The song is a folk rock ballad and sounded like The Beatles' "I'll Follow the Sun" (1964), "You've Got to Hide Your Love Away" (1965) and "Norwegian Wood (This Bird Has Flown)" (1965). This track is a folk-pop ballad, with Barry and Robin Gibb singing the lead while Maurice Gibb and Trevor Gordon playing lead guitar. It was recorded in August 1965 in Festival Studio during the same time as "Wine and Women" While Robin playing organ with Barry on acoustic guitar. Folk group The Flanagans recorded this song and released as a single with "Land of Beyond" as the B-side, on His Master's Voice Records. The Flanagans version sounded like The Seekers' Judith Durham.

Personnel
 Barry Gibb – lead vocals, acoustic guitar
 Robin Gibb – lead vocals, organ
 Maurice Gibb – 12-string lead guitar, backing vocals
 Trevor Gordon – lead guitar
 Uncredited – drums

References

Bee Gees songs
1965 songs
Songs written by Barry Gibb
Folk rock songs
Pop ballads